2017 NBA season may refer to:

2016–17 NBA season
2017–18 NBA season